All-Bran Buds is a variety of All-Bran cereal manufactured by Kellogg's. It is a wheat bran cereal that is a source of high fiber and psyllium. It is available in the United States and Canada.

It used to be available in the United Kingdom during the 1970s and 1980s. The cereal was available in Ireland until the mid-1980s.

Nutrition
A 1/3 cup serving (30g, 1.1 oz) has 70 calories, 1 g of fat, 24 g of carbohydrates, 7 g sugar, and 2g of protein.  It contains 13 g of fiber (3 soluble, 10 insoluble).

Ingredients
Wheat bran, sugar/glucose-fructose, psyllium seed husks, corn bran (USA only), salt, baking soda, natural colour, vitamins (USA only, thiamin hydrochloride, d-calcium pantothenate, pyridoxine hydrochloride, folic acid, iron), BHT.

All-Bran Buds is both Kosher and Halal.

External links
 

Kellogg's cereals
Halal food
Kosher food